Frances Richards may refer to:

 Frances Richards (Canadian artist) (1852–1934), Canadian painter
 Frances Richards (British artist) (1903–1985), British painter and illustrator
Frances Richards (actress), actress in The Living Ghost
Fran Richards, character in Emergency Hospital (film)

See also
 Francis Richards (disambiguation), male version of the name